The 2022–23 Boston Bruins season is the 99th season for the National Hockey League franchise that was established on November 1, 1924.

On March 2, 2023, the Bruins recorded their 100th standings point of the season in their 61st game, becoming the fastest team to 100 points in NHL history, and surpassing the record previously held by the 1976–77 Montreal Canadiens.

On March 11, 2023, the Bruins recorded their 50th win of the season in 64 games, becoming the fastest team to 50 wins in a season in NHL history, surpassing the record previously held by the 2018–19 Tampa Bay Lightning and 1995–96 Detroit Red Wings. Later that day they also became the first team in the league and the third fastest team to clinch a playoff berth in an 82 game season.

Standings

Divisional standings

Conference standings

Schedule and results

Regular season

Player statistics

As of February 25, 2023

Skaters

Goaltenders

†Denotes player spent time with another team before joining the Bruins. Stats reflect time with the Bruins only.
‡Denotes player was traded mid-season. Stats reflect time with the Bruins only.

Roster

Transactions
The Bruins have been involved in the following transactions during the 2022–23 season.

Key:

 Contract is entry-level.
 Contract initially takes effect in the 2023–24 season.

Trades

Players acquired

Players lost

Signings

Draft picks

Below are the Boston Bruins' selections at the 2022 NHL Entry Draft, which was held on July 7 to 8, 2022, at Bell Centre in Montreal.

References

Boston Bruins
Boston Bruins seasons
Bruins
Bruins
Boston Bruins
Boston Bruins